NGOMSL (Natural GOMS Language) is a variation of the GOMS technique in human computer interaction.

Overview

Natural GOMS Language technique was developed by David Kieras in 1988. The motivation was to make GOMS/CCT (cognitive complexity theory) simple to use, and still keep the power and flexibility of standard GOMS. This was necessary because GOMS did not have very well defined semantics.  This lack of definition meant that two equally competent evaluators could do evaluations on the same system and come up with very different results. Kieras's result was the development of high-level (natural language) syntax for GOMS representation with directions for doing a GOMS evaluation.  The recipe is referred to as a "top-down, breadth-first" expansion. The user's high-level goals are unfolded until only operators remain.  Generally operators are considered to be keystroke-level operations, but that is not a rigid requirement.

Since NGOMSL is based on CCT, it has certain properties that make it unique.  NGOMSL inherits the ability to not only give estimations for execution times but it can also estimate the time taken to learn how to use the system.  It also, however, shares one of the major disadvantages all of the previous methods. NGOMSL models user interaction as a serial operation.  One operation occupies the user completely, there is no multitasking, which makes NGOMSL inappropriate for analyzing tasks where the users are under time pressure, highly practiced and, in reality, do act in a parallel fashion.

Example
 Goal: Move a file into a subfolder in Windows XP
 Method for accomplishing goal of moving a file using the drag and drop option:
Step 1: Locate the icon of the source file on the screen
Step 2: Move mouse over the icon of the source file
Step 3: Press and keep holding the left mouse button
Step 4: Locate the icon of the destination folder on the screen
Step 5: Move mouse over the icon of the destination folder
Step 6: Release left mouse button
Step 7: Return with goal accomplished
 Method for accomplishing goal of moving a file using the cut and paste option:
Step 1: Recall that the first command is called "cut"
Step 2: Recall that the command "cut" is in the right click menu
Step 3: Locate the icon of the source file on the screen
Step 4: Accomplish the goal of selecting and executing the "cut" command
Step 5: Recall that the next command is called "paste"
Step 6: Recall that the command "paste" is in the right click menu
Step 7: Locate the icon of the destination folder on the screen
Step 8: Double click with left mouse button
Step 9: Locate empty spot on screen
Step 10: Move mouse to the empty spot
Step 11: Accomplish the goal of selecting and executing the "paste" command
Step 12: Return with goal accomplished

Selection rule set for goal: Move a file into a subfolder in Windows XP
If custom icon arrangement is used Then
accomplish goal: cutting-and-pasting.
If no custom icon arrangement is used Then
accomplish goal: drag-and-drop.
Return with goal accomplished.

See also 
 Human information processor model
 CPM-GOMS
 KLM-GOMS
 CMN-GOMS

References

Notations
 This article incorporates text from Dr. G. Abowd: GOMS Analysis Techniques - Final Essay, which has been released into GFDL by its author (see ).
 Judith Reitman Olson, Gary M. Olson: The Growth of Cognitive Modeling in Human-Computer Interaction Since GOMS, in: R. M. Baecker, J. Grudin, W. A. S. Buxton, S. Greenberg: Readings in Human-Computer Interaction: Towards the Year 2000. 1995, San Francisco, CA: Morgan Kaufmann.

Footnotes

Human–computer interaction